{{Infobox military unit
|unit_name= New York Air National Guard
|image= 102d Rescue Squadron - HH-60 HC-130 Hercules.jpg
|image_size = 280
|caption= An HC-130 of the 106th Rescue Wing refueling an HH-60 Pave Hawk over Long Island, New York. The 102d is the oldest unit in the New York Air National Guard, having over 90 years of service to the state and nation.
|dates= 17 November 1921 - present
|country=
|allegiance= 
|branch=  Air National Guard
|type=
|role= "To meet state and federal mission responsibilities."
|size=
|command_structure=  New York State Division of Military and Naval AffairsUnited States National Guard Bureau
|garrison=  New York Air National Guard, Stratton Air National Guard Base, 1 Air National Guard Road, Scotia, NY 12302
|garrison_label=
|nickname=
|patron=
|motto=
|colors=
|colors_label=
|march=
|mascot=
|battles=
|anniversaries=
|decorations=
|battle_honours=

|commander1= President Joe Biden(Commander-in-Chief)Frank Kendall III(Secretary of the Air Force)Governor Kathy Hochul''(Governor of the State of New York)
|commander1_label= Civilian leadership
|commander2= Major General Denise M. Donnell 
|commander2_label= State ANG commander
|commander3= Command Chief Master Sergeant Denny L. Richardson
|commander3_label= State ANG Command Chief
|notable_commanders=

|identification_symbol= 
|identification_symbol_label= Emblem of the New York Air National Guard

|aircraft_tanker=
|aircraft_transport= C-17 Globemaster IIIHC-130J Combat King IILC-130H Hercules
|aircraft_attack=
|aircraft_bomber=
|aircraft_electronic=
|aircraft_fighter=
|aircraft_helicopter=
|aircraft_helicopter_attack=
|aircraft_helicopter_cargo=
|aircraft_helicopter_multirole= HH-60G Pavehawk
|aircraft_helicopter_observation=
|aircraft_helicopter_transport=
|aircraft_helicopter_trainer=
|aircraft_helicopter_utility=
|aircraft_interceptor=
|aircraft_patrol=
|aircraft_recon=  MQ-9 Reaper
|aircraft_trainer=
}}

The New York Air National Guard (NY ANG) is the aerial militia of the State of New York, United States of America. It is, along with the New York Army National Guard, an element of the New York National Guard.

As state militia units, the units in the New York Air National Guard are not in the normal United States Air Force chain of command.  They are under the jurisdiction of the Governor of New York through the office of the New York Adjutant General unless they are federalized by order of the President of the United States.  The New York Air National Guard is headquartered at Stratton Air National Guard Base, Glenville, NY, and its current commander is Major General Timothy J. LaBarge.

Overview
Under the "Total Force" concept, New York Air National Guard units are considered to be Air Reserve Components (ARC) of the United States Air Force (USAF).  New York ANG units are trained and equipped by the Air Force and are operationally gained by a Major Command of the USAF if federalized.  In addition, the New York Air National Guard forces are assigned to Air Expeditionary Forces and are subject to deployment tasking orders along with their active duty and Air Force Reserve counterparts in their assigned cycle deployment window.

Along with their federal reserve obligations, as state militia units the elements of the New York ANG are subject to being activated by order of the Governor to provide protection of life and property, and preserve peace, order and public safety. State missions include disaster relief in times of earthquakes, hurricanes, floods and forest fires, search and rescue, protection of vital public services, and support to civil defense.

 Current structure 
Current New York Air National Guard Structure;

105th Airlift Wing – Stewart Air National Guard Base, Newburgh
Meets inter-theater airlift and expeditionary combat support commitments. Operates the C-17A Globemaster III.

 105th Operations Group 
137th Airlift Squadron
105th Operational Support Squadron
 105th Maintenance Group
105th Aircraft Maintenance Squadron
105th Maintenance Squadron
105th Maintenance Operations Flight
 105th Mission Support Group
105th Civil Engineering Squadron
105th Force Support Squadron
105th Logistics Readiness Squadron
105th Base Defense Squadron
105th Communications Flight
 105th Medical Group
 105th Comptroller Flight
 213th Engineering Installation Squadron

106th Rescue Wing – Francis S. Gabreski Air National Guard Base, Westhampton 
Provides worldwide combat search and rescue coverage for U.S. and allied forces. Combat search and rescue missions include flying low-level, preferably at night aided with night vision goggles, to an objective area where aerial refueling of a rescue helicopter is performed, or pararescue teams are deployed. Operates the HH-60G Pavehawk and HC-130J Combat King II.

106th Operations Group
101st Rescue Squadron [Using HH-60G Pave Hawk]
102nd Rescue Squadron [Using HC-130J Combat King II]
103rd Rescue Squadron [Pararescue elements]
Operation Support Squadron
106th Mission Support Group
106th Security Forces Squadron
106th Civil Engineering Squadron
106th Aerial Port Flight
106th Logistics Readiness Squadron
106th Services Flight
106th Communications Flight
106th Force Support Group
106th Personnel Flight
106th Honour Guard
106th Maintenance Group
106th Aircraft Maintenance Squadron
106th Maintenance Squadron
106th Maintenance Operations Flight
106th Medical Group

107th Attack Wing – Niagara Falls Air Reserve Station, Niagara Falls
The 107th was officially re-designated the 107th Attack Wing on 15 March 2017. The name change reflects the wing's mission of providing aircrew members and supporting staff trained to operate the MQ-9 Reaper remotely piloted aircraft. The wing began transformation and training of crews and personnel in 2014. The 107th is the second New York Air National Guard wing to assume the remotely piloted aircraft mission. Previously operated the C-130H Hercules as an airlift wing.

107th Operations Group
Operations Support Squadron
136th Attack Squadron [Using MQ-9 Reaper]
107th Mission Support Group
Civil Engineer Squadron
Communications Flight
Logistics Readiness Squadron
Mission Support Flight
Security Forces Squadron
Services Flight
107th Medical Group

109th Airlift Wing – Stratton Air National Guard Base, Schenectady

The 109th Airlift Wing's mission is to provide airlift support to the National Science Foundation's South Pole and Arctic research programs by flying specialized LC-130H Hercules airlifters, modified with wheel-ski gear, in support of Arctic and Antarctic operations. The 109th Airlift Wing is the only unit in the world to fly these aircraft.

109th Operations Group
139th Airlift Squadron
139th Aeromedical Squadron
109th Operations Support Flight
109th Mission Support Group
109th Security Forces Squadron
109th Civil Engineer Squadron
109th Force Support Squadron
109th Aerial Port Flight
109th Logistics Readiness Squadron
109th Services Flight
109th Communications Flight
109th Maintenance Group
109th Aircraft Maintenance Squadron
109th Maintenance Squadron
109th Maintenance Operations Flight
109th Medical Group

174th Attack Wing – Hancock Field Air National Guard Base, Syracuse
Currently operates the MQ-9 Reaper unmanned aerial vehicle (UAV). Its mission is to provide qualified airmen and weapon systems engaging in global air, space and cyberspace operations; supporting homeland defense, joint operations and aid to civil authorities at the direction of the Governor.

 152nd Air Operations Group
 274th Air Support Operations Squadron
 Air and Space Communication Squadron
 Air Intelligence Squadron 
 Combat Operations Squadron
 174th Operations Group
 108th Attack Squadron – MQ-9A Reaper
 138th Attack Squadron – MQ-9A Reaper
 174th Operation Support Squadron
 174th Maintenance Group
 174th Mission Support Group
 174th Medical Group

Eastern Air Defense Sector – Griffiss Business and Technology Park, Rome
The Eastern Air Defense Sector originated in 1956 as the 4621st Air Defense Wing. It is one of two sectors that carries out NORAD's aerospace warning and control mission. The Eastern Air Defense Sector is part of the U.S. Continental NORAD Region. There are also Canadian and Alaskan NORAD regions. This unit also provides direct support for the annual NORAD Tracks Santa program.

History
 Origins 

The Militia Act of 1903 established the present National Guard system, units raised by the states but paid for by the Federal Government, liable for immediate state service. If federalized by Presidential order, they fall under the regular military chain of command. On 1 June 1920, the Militia Bureau issued Circular No.1 on organization of National Guard air units.

The New York Air National Guard origins date to 28 August 1917 with the establishment of the 102d Aero Squadron as part of the World War I American Expeditionary Force.  Its origins begin however, on 30 April 1908 as the 1st Aero Company, a pre-World War I independent unit of the New York National Guard.  The 1st Aero Company was provisionally recognized by the federal government in June 1916 and called to active duty between July 13, 1916, and November 15, 1916, to continue training with the purpose of joining the 1st Aero Squadron, a Regular Army unit deployed to Mexico with the Punitive Expedition. The 1st Aero Company, however, never left Long Island and was disbanded on May 23, 1917, shortly after the United States entered World War I, when the Army decided not to use national guard aviation units in the war effort. Its history and lineage were bestowed on the 102d Observation Squadron.    The 102d Aero Squadron was demobilized 1918 Armistice with Germany in 1919.

New York National Guard

Constituted in 1920 as the 102nd Squadron (Observation), the squadron was assigned to the 27th Division, allotted to the state of New York, as its divisional aviation. The unit was organized in November 1921 from the "Observation Squadron, New York National Guard, which had been organized on 22 March 1921 at Hempstead, New York, with personnel from K Company, 14th Infantry, New York National Guard. It was reorganized and federally recognized in November 1922 at Miller Field on Staten Island and re-designated as the 102nd Observation Squadron in January 1923. It is one of the 29 original National Guard Observation Squadrons of the United States Army National Guard formed before World War II.

Its operations were primarily air transportation and aircraft repair and maintenance. However, squadron elements were called up periodically by the state of New York to perform emergency duties that included reconnaissance for the Treasury Department of vessels conducting illegal-liquor trade off the New York-New Jersey coast in the 1920s; support of flood relief efforts in Vermont 6–16 November 1927; aid to civil authorities during a prison break from the maximum security Auburn Prison, 11–12 December 1930; and flood relief efforts in upstate New York 11–13 July 1935.

The 102d Observation Squadron was ordered into active service on 15 October 1940 as part of the buildup of the Army Air Corps prior to the United States entry into World War II.

New York Air National Guard

On 24 May 1946, the United States Army Air Forces, in response to dramatic postwar military budget cuts imposed by President Harry S. Truman, allocated inactive unit designations to the National Guard Bureau for the formation of an Air Force National Guard. These unit designations were allotted and transferred to various State National Guard bureaus to provide them unit designations to re-establish them as Air National Guard units.

The modern New York ANG received federal recognition on 20 February 1947 as the 102d Bombardment Squadron (Light) at Floyd Bennett Field, Brooklyn.  It was equipped with B-26 Invaders and was assigned to Tactical Air Command.  18 September 1947, however, is considered the New York Air National Guard's official birth concurrent with the establishment of the United States Air Force as a separate branch of the United States military under the National Security Act.

The allocations to the New York ANG included the 52d Fighter Wing, a command and control organization at Westchester County Airport, receiving federal recognition on 3 October 1947;  the 139th Fighter Squadron at Schenectady County Airport on 18 October 1948; the 136th Fighter Squadron at Niagara Falls International Airport and the 137th Fighter Squadron at Westchester County Airport on 8 December 1948.   All of these squadrons were equipped with F-51 Mustangs and assumed an air defense missions over various areas of the state.

At the end of October 1950, the ANG converted to the wing-base (Hobson Plan) organization. As a result, the 52d Fighter Wing was withdrawn from the New York ANG and inactivated on 31 October 1950.  The 106th Bombardment Wing at Brooklyn, and the 107th Fighter Wing at Niagara Falls were formed and were simultaneously allotted to the NY ANG and activated to replace the 52d.

In 1956, the 137th Fighter-Interceptor Squadron at Westchester County Airport was authorized to expand to a group level and the 105th Fighter Group (Air Defense) received federal recognition and activated on 1 May 1956.  In addition, the 109th FIS at Schenectady expanded into the 109th Fighter Group (Air Defense) the same date.  1962 saw the expansion of the 138th Tactical Fighter Squadron into the 174th Tactical Fighter Group''' at Syracuse.

Today, the New York Air National Guard is the largest and most diverse ANG organization of the National Guard Bureau.  After the September 11th, 2001 terrorist attacks on the United States, elements of every Air National Guard unit in New York has been activated in support of the Global War on Terrorism. Flight crews, aircraft maintenance personnel, communications technicians, air controllers and air security personnel were engaged in Operation Noble Eagle air defense overflights of major United States cities.  Also, New York ANG units have been deployed overseas as part of Operation Enduring Freedom in Afghanistan and Operation Iraqi Freedom in Iraq as well as other locations as directed.

See also

New York Guard
New York Naval Militia
New York Wing Civil Air Patrol

References

 Gross, Charles J (1996), The Air National Guard and the American Military Tradition, United States Dept. of Defense, 
 New York Air National Guard (N.Y. Division of Military and Naval Affairs)

External links

Official sites
 105th Airlift Wing
 106th Rescue Wing
 107th Airlift Wing
 109th Airlift Wing
 152nd Air Operations Group
 174th Fighter Wing
 Northeast Air Defense Sector (NEADS)

Unofficial sites
 109th Airlift Wing at GlobalSecurity.org

United States Air National Guard
Military in New York (state)